Louis Schiess (born 5 September 1925) was a Swiss sailor. He competed in the Finn event at the 1960 Summer Olympics.

References

External links
 

1925 births
Possibly living people
Swiss male sailors (sport)
Olympic sailors of Switzerland
Sailors at the 1960 Summer Olympics – Finn
People from Appenzell Ausserrhoden
20th-century Swiss people